The 1997 FIA GT Sebring 3 Hours  was the tenth race of the 1997 FIA GT Championship season.  It was run at Sebring International Raceway, United States on October 18, 1997.

Official results
Class winners in bold.  Cars failing to complete 75% of winner's distance marked as Not Classified (NC).

Statistics
 Pole Position – #8 BMW Motorsport – 1:55.929
 Fastest Lap – #9 BMW Motorsport – 1:59.290
 Distance – 423.354 km
 Average Speed – 140.867 km/h

External links
 World Sports Prototype Racing – Race Results

S
Sebring 3 Hours
FIA GT Sebring 3